A Concept from Fire is the only studio album by A Dozen Furies.

Track listing

References

2005 albums
A Dozen Furies albums
Sanctuary Records albums